Winneshiekia is an extinct genus of dekatriatan, a clade of chelicerate arthropods. Fossils of the single and type species, W. youngae, have been discovered in deposits of the Middle Ordovician period (Darriwilian epoch) in Iowa, in the United States. The name of the genus is derived from the Winneshiek Shale, the formation in which it was discovered. The species name youngae honors Jean N. Young, an American geologist who contributed greatly to the discovery of the Winneshiek Shale.

References

Dekatriata
Middle Ordovician first appearances
Ordovician arthropods
Fossils of the United States
Fossil taxa described in 2015